Juana Romani, née Carolina Carlesimo (30 April 1867 – 1923/24) was an Italian-born French portrait painter and artists' model.

Biography 
She was born in Velletri. At the age of ten, she went to Paris with her mother and stepfather, Temistocle Romani, an engineer who was seeking employment there. They settled in the Latin Quarter and she was put to work as a model at several art schools. It was not long, however, before Filippo Colarossi, founder of the Académie Colarossi, took a special interest in her; inviting her to work and study at his school.

In 1882, she posed for "Diana the Huntress", a well-known sculpture by Alexandre Falguière. She also posed for Carolus-Duran, Ferdinand Roybet, who gave her lessons, and Jean-Jacques Henner, with whom she had a brief affair. At the age of nineteen "Il Romani", as she was called, decided to pursue her own career in art. That same year, she changed her first name to "Juana", the Spanish equivalent of her middle name, "Giovanna".

She began to exhibit her works in 1888 at the Salon of the Société des Artistes Français and exhibited with them regularly until 1904. She was especially valued as a painter of female portraits, including many women from notable families, often depicting them as mythological or symbolic figures. One of her portraits was awarded a silver medal at the Exposition Universelle (1889). In 1901, she donated 5,000 lire to the art school in her home town. Four years later, it was officially renamed the "Scuola d'Arte Juana Romani".

Her work was also well received by the critics. In 1896, Louis Gonse of  declared that she was more skillful than her mentor, Roybet. She usually painted directly on the canvas, without preliminary sketching, and sold many works before they were finished.

In her later years, she became mentally unsound and was confined to a psychiatric hospital in Paris. She died there, forgotten, around 1924. Her remaining works were auctioned off at the Hôtel Drouot. Many of her paintings may be seen at the Musée d'Orsay.

Selected portraits

References

Further reading
 Juana Romani in the french Wikipedia
 Cristina Contilli, Juana Romani (1867-1924) Modella, pittrice e scultrice della Belle Epoque, Lulu, 2016 
 Gabriela Romani, Juana Romani, Blurb, 2016

External links 

"Le Tracce della Veliterna Juana Romani" @ the Università del Carnevale
ArtNet: More works by Romani.
Juana Romani blog

1869 births
1924 deaths
19th-century Italian painters
20th-century Italian painters
Italian women painters
Italian portrait painters
Italian artists' models
20th-century Italian women artists
19th-century Italian women artists
People from Velletri